The Green River is a tributary of Five Rivers in the U.S. state of Oregon. It arises in the Siuslaw National Forest of the Central Oregon Coast Range and flows generally northeast to meet Five Rivers upstream of the rural community of Fisher. The Green River's named tributaries from source to mouth are the East Fork Green River and Ryan Creek.

See also
 List of rivers of Oregon

References

Alsea River
Rivers of Lane County, Oregon
Rivers of Oregon